The Sablatnig-Beuchelt was a German automobile manufactured from 1925 until 1926. A 1496 cc four-cylinder designed by Sablatnig, it was similar to many other German cars of the early 1920s.

References
David Burgess Wise, The New Illustrated Encyclopedia of Automobiles.

Defunct motor vehicle manufacturers of Germany